ARCV-n is a large family of viruses authored by the ARCV group through October - November 1992 and polymorphed with the PS-MPC virus generation tool (hence they are very similar). ARCV-n viruses seem to infect COM (perhaps ) and/or EXE files rapidly, but do not damage the compromised machine, instead displaying various text messages to the user. An infected file will have the ARCV-n virus appended to the end of it.

External links 
ARCV-n, by McAfee
Copies of ARCV-n behavior listings available here and here
PS-MPC (ARCV-1), by Adam David, Frisk Software International, the University of Hamburg

DOS file viruses